DYUR (105.1 FM), broadcasting as Halo Halo 105.1, is a radio station owned and operated by Viva Live, Inc., a subsidiary of Viva Entertainment. The station's studio and transmitter are located at the 2nd floor of AMP Building, Veterans Drive, Lower Nivel Hills, Lahug, Cebu City. This station operates daily from 4:00 AM to 1:00 AM.

Profile

From 1993 to 2010, it was known as UR105 Ultimate Radio, carrying a CHR/Top 40 format. In 2010, after the success of a daily Christian program, the station rebranded as Mango Radio and carried a christian radio format.

In 2013, Viva Live, Inc. acquired the franchises of Ultimate Entertainment Inc., prompting Mango Radio to move its broadcasts online. In October 2014, the station went back on air as Oomph Radio 105.1, carrying a CHR/Top 40 format. In June 2016, the station rebranded back to UR105 and added 70s, 80s and 90s to its playlist, despite retaining its format. However, the following month, Oomph Radio returned, this time introducing Anime, J-Pop and K-Pop to its original format. In February 2017, the Oomph Radio brand was retired once again due to management decision.

On May 1, 2017, the station was relaunched as Halo Halo, the first and only FM station in each city playing only Original Pilipino Music.<ref>[https://www.philstar.com/entertainment/2017/05/14/1699965/halo-halo-radio-boosts-pinoy-pop-south Halo Halo Radio boosts Pinoy pop in the Southern Mindanao

Halo Halo Stations

References

Viva Entertainment
Radio stations established in 1993
DYUR
Radio stations in Metro Cebu